The 48 Hour Film Festival can refer to any of these film competitions:
 the 48 Hour Film Project
 the New Zealand-based 48HOURS
 Extremefilmmaker's 48 Hour Film Festival